Babken Simonyan (born 20 March 1952) is an Armenian-Serbian poet, essayist, translator, university professor and diplomat currently serving as the honorary consul of Serbia in Armenia since 2006.

He is a member of the Writers Union of Armenia, Association of Writers of Serbia and Adligat. He teaches Serbian language at the Yerevan State University.

Awards 
 Branko Radičević Award (2012)
 Gold Medal (2015, by President of Serbia)
 Movses Khorenatsi Award (2019)

Works

Books 
 Miris domovine, 1994.
 Kroz balkansku vatru: putopisi, eseji, razgovori,1995.
 Hodočašće, 1998.
 Od Ararata do Kosova: (pesme, eseji, putopisi, beleške, prevodi), 2000.
 Bibliografija: Publikacija o Srbiji i jermensko-srpskim istorijskim, književnim i kulturnim vezama, 2002.
 Artamet, 2010.
 Хачкар: стихи, 2012.
 Grumen zemlje srpske, 2017.

Translations 
 Noć skuplja vijeka, translation of Njegoš's work, 2022.

Articles 
 Ani, 1991.
 Miris domovine, 1992.
 Moja stara kuća, 1992.
 Tuga, 1995.
 Još se čuje..., 1995.
 Molitva pred ikonom, 1995.
 Politika panturcizma kao ideološko oružje, 1996.
 Čovek jake volje, 1997.
 Riječ za riječ, 1997.
 Nad grobom Desanke Maksimović, 1997.
 Da je živa - u njen bih zagrljaj od tuge, 1998
 Majke što delila bi sa mnom bol - sad nema, 1998.
 Duboka žalost, da je iscelim ne umem..., 1998.
 Zgasla mati moja, plamičak ognjišta mog, 1998.
 Majci, 1998.
 Monolog, 1998.
 Traganje za duhovnom prošlošču, 1998.
 Iste su nam muke, stradanja i patnje, 1998.
 Simonida, 2000.
 Očaran njegoševskim metaforama, co-author, 2000.
 Tuga, 2000.
 Jeremnčić, 2000.
 Ararat, 2003.
 Sudbom slični, 20004.
 Sveto ime Lim, 2007.
 U ateljeu, 2007.
 Jermenija Srbiji; Dud Svetog Save; Santa Maria della Salute, 2010.
 Majčine ruke, 2010.
 Ogrejano kosovskim suncem, 2010.
 Prekinuta molitva, 2011.
 More i splavar, 2011.
 Grančica, 2011.
 Na mostu Rialto, 2011.
 Bela noć, 2011.
 Oprosti majko, 2011.
 Knjiga kao kult i duhovna hrana, 2011.
 Novo pesničko hodočašće, 2012.
 Od Svetog Save do "Kosovskog sunca", 2015.
 Moja stara kuća, 2015.
 Srpski pesnici pevaju Jermeniji, 2017.
 San, 2017.
 Santa Maria della Salute, 2017.
 Utri suze, Srbijo! 2017.

References 

1952 births
Living people
People from Yerevan
Armenian writers
Armenian poets
Armenian translators
Serbian writers
Serbian poets
Serbian translators
Serbian diplomats
Serbian people of Armenian descent
Naturalized citizens of Serbia
Yerevan State University alumni
Academic staff of Yerevan State University